The Love That Dares is a lost 1919 silent film drama directed by Harry Millarde and starring Madlaine Traverse. It was produced and distributed by Fox Film Corporation.

Cast
Madlaine Traverse - Olive Risdon
Thomas Santschi - Perry Risdon
Frank Elliott - Ned Beckwith
Mae Gaston - Marta Holmes
Thomas Guise - Rutherford
George B. Williams - Haynes

See also
1937 Fox vault fire

References

External links

1919 films
American silent feature films
Fox Film films
Lost American films
Films directed by Harry F. Millarde
American black-and-white films
Silent American drama films
1919 drama films
1919 lost films
Lost drama films
1910s American films